

The Karyakshama Seva Vibhushanaya (KSV, Efficient Service Order) (Sinhala: කාර්යක්ෂම සේවා විභූෂණය kāryakṣama sēvā vibhūṣaṇaya) is a service medal awarded by the Military of Sri Lanka to commissioned officers of the Sri Lanka Army Volunteer Force, in recognition of "...long, meritorious, loyal and valuable service of proven capacity". Established on 7 January 1986, it does not confer any individual precedence. 

The KSV replaced the Efficiency Decoration (Ceylon) in 1972 (awarded to volunteer officers of the Ceylon Army), and is roughly equivalent to the Volunteer Reserves Service Medal.

Award process
All commissioned officers of the Sri Lanka Army Volunteer Force (including those attached to the National Cadet Corps) who, by or after 22 May 1972, have completed 18 years of excellent service are eligible for the award.

Recipients are entitled to use the post-nominal letters "KSV".

The first recipients of this decoration, set out in The Sri Lanka Gazette of 12 October 1990, were:

References

Army, Sri Lanka. (1st Edition - October 1999). "50 Years On" - 1949-1999, Sri Lanka Army.

External links
Sri Lanka Army
Ministry of Defence : Sri Lanka

Military awards and decorations of Sri Lanka
Awards established in 1972